Shawn Edward is a Saint Lucian politician and representative in the House of Assembly for the Constituency of Dennery North for the Saint Lucia Labour Party. Edward also serves as Minister for Education, Sustainable Development, Innovation, Science, Technology and Vocational Training. Edward won his seat once again at the 2021 Saint Lucian General Election. He is also the 2nd Deputy Political Leader of the Saint Lucia Labour Party. Edward has not lost his seat since his entry in the 2011 Saint Lucian General Election.

Political career 
Edward made his debut in Lucian politics in 2011 winning his seat. From there he went on to be Minister for Youth Development and Sports during the Kenny Anthony led administration. Edward claimed his spot in the 2021 Saint Lucian General Election, where he was later sworn in as Minister for Education, Sustainable Development, Innovation, Science, Technology and Vocational Training.

References 

Members of the House of Assembly of Saint Lucia
Saint Lucia Labour Party politicians
Living people
Government ministers of Saint Lucia
21st-century Saint Lucian politicians
Year of birth missing (living people)